Andrei Pervyshin (born February 2, 1985) is a Russian professional ice hockey player who currently plays Avangard Omsk in the Kontinental Hockey League (KHL). He was selected by St. Louis Blues in the 8th round (253rd overall) of the 2003 NHL Entry Draft.

Pervyshin has previously played with HC CSKA Moscow for the 2013–14 season, before signing a one-year contract with expansion club HC Sochi on May 21, 2014. Peryshin was later selected as Sochi's inaugural team Captain for the 2014–15 season.

Career statistics

Regular season and playoffs

International

References

External links

1985 births
Ak Bars Kazan players
Avangard Omsk players
HC CSKA Moscow players
Living people
Lokomotiv Yaroslavl players
St. Louis Blues draft picks
SKA Saint Petersburg players
HC Sochi players
HC Spartak Moscow players
Traktor Chelyabinsk players
Russian ice hockey defencemen
Sportspeople from Arkhangelsk